The Rural Studio is a design-build architecture studio run by Auburn University. It teaches students about the social responsibilities of the profession of architecture and provides good houses and buildings for poor communities in rural west Alabama, US, part of what is called the "Black Belt".

The studio was founded in 1993 by architects Samuel Mockbee and D. K. Ruth. It is led by UK-born architect Andrew Freear. Each year the program builds several projects: a house by the third-year students, and two to three thesis projects by groups of 3 to 5 fifth-year students. The Rural Studio has built more than 80 houses and civic projects in Hale, Perry and Marengo counties. The Rural Studio is based in Newbern, a small town in Hale County. Many of its best-known projects are in the tiny community of Mason's Bend, on the banks of the Black Warrior River.

The studio has been criticized for the way its projects take advantage of the power relations inherent in gift-giving, and for mistaking elitist architectural and middle-class values, rather than the process of political emancipation and self-determination, as a way to improve the lives of the poor.

$20K House
The $20K House is an ongoing research project at the Rural Studio that seeks to address the pressing need for decent and affordable housing in Hale County, Alabama. Nearly 30% of the people in Hale County live in poverty. Due to the lack of conventional credit for people with their level of income, and insufficient knowledge about alternative sources of funding, mobile homes offer the only chance for home ownership for many. Unlike a house, which is an asset for its owner, trailers deteriorate very quickly and depreciate over time. Mobile homes are also correlated with higher cancer rates due to the use of formaldehyde in their construction.

The $20k House project is intended to design a model home that could be reproduced on a large scale, and thereby become a viable alternative to a mobile home. The challenge is to build a house for $20,000, ten to twelve thousand of which will go towards materials and the remainder to contracted labor. Once a truly successful model has been designed, the aim is to sell the houses in conjunction with the "502 Direct Loan" provided by the Rural Housing Service. The project began in 2005, and there have been at least 16 iterations of the house.

Projects
By year. Some designers are listed.

2010–2011

Lion's Park - Phase VI (hub), Greensboro

2009–2010

Lion's Park - Phase V (playscape), Greensboro

2008–2009

Lion's Park - Phase IV (skateplay), Greensboro

2007–2008

20K - Bridge Greensboro      
20K - Loft Greensboro           
20K - Pattern Book Greensboro 
20K - Roundwood Greensboro     
St. Luke's Church Renovation, Cahawba, Alabama

2006–2007

Lion's Park - Phase II (toilets), Greensboro 
Lion's Park - Phase III (surfacing), Greensboro 
Akron Boys & Girls Club - II
$20K House - Phase III - Greensboro, Alabama
St. Luke's Episcopal Church, CahawbaLeon, John Mansour, Candace Rimes, Jamie Sartory, Fuller Sherrod, Walker Stone, Nick Wickersham

2005–2006

Lion's Park - Phase I, Greensboro
Hale County Hospital, Greensboro
Hale County Animal Shelter, Greensboro
$20K House - Phase II, Greensboro
Michelle's House, Greensboro
Anna Marie Bevil, Jason Blankenship, Brittany Creehan, Jacob Fyfe, Brittany Graeber, Jennifer Isenburg, Carrie Laurendine, Jonathan Mayhall, Don Mott, Brandon Rainosek, Haley Robinson, Christopher Terrell, Marcus Buckner-Perry, Justyn Chandler, Michelle Clark, Taylor Clark, Evan Dick, Lori Fine, Robert Hall, Drew Jerdan, Brett Randall Jones, Ben Krauss, Carolyn Norton, John Plaster, Dorothy Sherling, Casey Smith, Kathleen Webb, Terran Wilson

2004–2005

Perry Lakes Canopy Tower 
Adrienne Brady, Natalie Butts, Paul Howard, Coley Mulcahy
Perry County Learning Center
Dereck Aplin, Sam Currie, Amy Bell, Angela Hughey, Turnley Smith
Christine's House, Mason's Bend, Hale County
Steven Long, Amy Bullington
Re-sourcing
David Garner
$20K House - Phase I, Hale County
Kellie Stokes, Laura Noguera, Phillip March Jones, Hana Loftus, Min Joo Kim
Willie Bell House, Mason's Bend, Hale County

2003–2004

Alabama Rural Heritage Center, Thomaston
Abby Barnett Davis, Melissa Harold, Paul Kardous, Nathan Makemeson, Robert White
Newbern Volunteer Fire Department, Newbern
Will Brothers, Elizabeth Ellington, Matthew Finley, Leia Price
Perry Lakes Park Bridge, Perry County
Matthew Edwards, Lynielle Houston, Charlie Jorgensen, Sara Singleton
Sub Rosa Pantheon, Newbern
Carol Mockbee
Patrick House, Newbern
Outside In, Greensboro

2002–2003

Perry Lakes Toilets and Boardwalk, Marion
Sarah Dunn, Matt Foley, Brannen Park, Melissa Sullivan
Rural Heritage Center Gift Shop
Emily McGlohn, Katie B. Johnston, John David Caldwell
Sunshine School, Newbern
Organic Farmer's Stand, Newbern
Ola Mae Porch
Newbern Little League Field, Newbern
Jason A. Hunsucker, Jermaine Washington, Julie Hay, Patrick Nelson
Music Man House, Greensboro
dining hall, Newbern
Matt Christopher, Kris Johnson, Albert Ulysses Mitchum II, Clark Todd Gollotte

2001–2002

Perry Lakes Cedar Pavilion 
Jennifer Bonner, Mary Beth Maness, Nathan Orrison, Anthony Tindill 
Antioch Baptist Church
Jared Fulton, Gabe Michaud, William Nauck, Marion McElroy 
HERO Knowledge Cafe, Greensboro
Andrea Ray, John McCabe, Daniel Sweeney, Matt Wilson 
Great Hall at Morrisette, Newbern
Akron Senior Center
Matthew Barrett, Jonathan Graves, Breanna Hinderliter, Joseph Yeager 
Shiles House
Lucy House, Mason's Bend, Hale County
Keith Zawistowski, Marie Zawistowski, James Tate, Ben Cannard, Kerry Larkin, Floris Keverling Buisman
Architectural Ambulance

2000–2001

Newbern Baseball Club, Newbern
Corrugated Cardboard Pod, Newbern
Chantilly House, Newbern
Bodark Amphitheatre, Newbern
Akron Boys & Girls Club
Sanders/Dudley House, Greensboro
Newbern Playground, Newbern

1999–2000

Glass Chapel, Mason's Bend, Hale County 
Thomaston Farmer's Market 
Pods at Morrisette, Newbern
Spencer House, Newbern
Sanders/Dudley House, Greensboro
Mason's Bend Basketball Court

1998–1999

Seed House
HERO Children's Center, Greensboro
Lewis House
Supershed & Bathhouse, Newbern
Spencer House, Newbern
Sanders/Dudley House, Greensboro

1997–1998

Butterfly House, Mason's Bend, Hale County
HERO Children's Center, Greensboro
Lewis House
Supershed & Bathhouse, Newbern
Spencer House, Newbern

1996–1997

Goat House, Josh Cooper and Iain Stewart
Butterfly House, Mason's Bend, Hale County 
William Austin, Clifford Brooks,  Kristen Kepner Coleman, Joshua Daniel,  Adam Gerndt, Jo Beth Gleason, Jeremy Moffet, Justin Patwin, Hunter Simmons, Elizabeth Stallworth, Samuel Watkins, William Whittaker Jr., Heather Wootten, Jeff Marteski, Timothy Sliger, Robert Sproull, Tommy Replogle, Jon Schumann, John Ritchie, Charlie Hughes, Jimmy Turner, Jeff Johnston, 
Akron Pavilion 
H.E.R.O. Playscape, Joe Alcock and Melissa Teng Greensboro

1995–1996

Wilson House, Mason's Bend, Hale County

1994–1995

Yancey Chapel, Sawyerville, Hale County (See pictures at http://architecture.myninjaplease.com/?p=321.)
Hay Bale House, Mason's Bend, Hale County
Wilson House, Mason's Bend, Hale County
Supershed, Newbern

1993–1994

Smoke House, Mason's Bend, Hale County
Hay Bale House, Mason's Bend, Hale County

Awards 

 2008 Global Award for Sustainable Architecture, awarded to Andrew Freear

References

Andrea Oppenheimer Dean and Timothy Hursley, (2005) "Proceed and Be Bold: Rural Studio After Samuel Mockbee". Princeton Architectural Press. 
 Samuel Mockbee, David Moos and Gail Trechsel. (2003) Samuel Mockbee and the Rural Studio. Birmingham Museum of Art. 
 Andrea Oppenheimer Dean, photographer, Timothy Hursley. (2002) Rural Studio: Samuel Mockbee and an Architecture of Decency. Princeton Architectural Press.

External links

 official Rural Studio Website
 Rural Studio film — Rural Studio documentary website.
 NPR Speaking of Faith: "An Architecture of Decency" — public radio program about project:  includes dynamic map of selected projects and audio slideshows.
 Citizen Architect - Rural Studio film — documentary about Samuel Mockbee, made by former students Jack Sanders and Sam Douglas (2010).
 Hortus (design + architecture magazine) — "L'architettura della decenza" — by Federico De Matteis (in Italian).

Auburn University
Architecture schools in the United States
Education in Hale County, Alabama
Architecture in Alabama
1993 establishments in Alabama